William Bull may refer to:

 William Bull (diver) (1886–1970), British Olympic diver
 William Bull (governor) (1638–1755), landowner and politician in the Province of South Carolina
 William Bull II (1710–1791), lieutenant governor of the Province of South Carolina
 William Bull (minister) (1738–1814), English independent minister
 William Bull (botanist) (1828–1902), English botanist
 William Bull (landowner) (1867–1956), founder of Bilbul, a small town in New South Wales, Australia
 Sir William Bull, 1st Baronet (1863–1931), British solicitor and politician
 William Frederick Bull, Canadian diplomat
 William Ford Bull (1876–1941), American football player and coach
 William T. Bull (1865–1924), American football player and coach
 William L. Bull (1844–1914), American banker and president of the New York Stock Exchange

See also
 William "Bull" Nelson (1824–1862), American naval officer
 William "Bull" Halsey, American naval officer
Bull (surname)